Alberto Minoia (born May 6, 1960) is a retired Italian professional football player.

He played 3 seasons (18 games, 1 goal) in the Serie A for A.C. Milan, scoring his first (and last) Serie A goal in his second game for the team.

In 1979, he was called up for the Italy national under-21 football team, but did not play in that game.

Honours
 Serie A champion: 1978/79.
 Mitropa Cup winner: 1981/82.

References

1960 births
Living people
Italian footballers
Serie A players
A.C. Milan players
A.S. Sambenedettese players
S.S. Arezzo players
Taranto F.C. 1927 players
Montevarchi Calcio Aquila 1902 players
Association football defenders